Anwar Kamal Pasha, (23 February 1925 – 13 October 1987) was the pioneer in the Pakistan film industry and an early Pakistani film director and producer from Lahore, Pakistan.

Life and career
Pasha was a graduate from the Forman Christian College, Lahore, and went on to earn two Master of Arts degrees at the University of the Punjab. He generally scripted, produced and directed his own films, which dealt with such social themes as poverty, love, social strata, suicide, moral decay and death.

Anwar Kamal Pasha trained and introduced many new people to the Pakistan film industry who later made a name for themselves, including film directors M. S. Dar, M. Akram, Altaf Hussain (film director), music directors Master Inayat Hussain and later his younger brother Master Abdullah. He also introduced Pakistani film actors Aslam Pervaiz, Sabiha Khanum, Musarrat Nazir, Nayyar Sultana, Bahar Begum and Rani. He made a total of 24 movies.

Personal life
He was the son of poet and scholar Hakim Ahmad Shuja and the husband of film actress Shamim Bano with whom he had five  children, three sons and two daughters.

Death
Anwar Kamal Pasha died on 13 October 1987 at age 62 but left behind a legacy as one of the pioneer producers-directors of Pakistani cinema.

Filmography
Major films by Anwar Kamal Pasha, made between 1949 and the 1980s, are:
 1949: Shahida
 1949: Do Ansoo
 1950: Gabhroo
 1951: Dilbar
 1952: Dupatta (assisted main director Sibtain Fazli; the movie's story was written by Hakim Ahmad Shuja)
 1953: Ghulam 
 1954: Gumnaam (with music by Master Inayat Hussain and some lyrics adapted from a famous poem by Hakim Ahmad Shuja)
 1955: Inteqam
 1955: Qatil  (with two film songs by composer Master Inayat Hussain and song lyricist Qateel Shifai)
 1956: Dullah Bhatti  (written and co-directed with M.S. Dar, with music by Ghulam Ahmed Chishti)
 1956: Chann Mahi (Punjabi) (with music by Rasheed Attre) 
 1956: Sarfarosh (with music by Rasheed Attre)
 1957: Zulfaan (in Punjabi language)
 1957: Laila Majnu
 1958: Anarkali (with film songs music by Rasheed Attre and Master Inayat Hussain)
 1959: Gumrah
 1960: Watan
 1962: Mehboob
 1963: Sazish
 1964: Safaid Khoon
 1966: Parohna
 1974: Khana Dey Khan Parohne
 1979: Wehshi Gujjar
 1981: Sher Khan (in Punjabi language, with film songs by music director Wajahat Attre)
 1983: Border Bullet

Awards and recognition
 Nigar Award for Best Scriptwriter for film Watan (1960)
 Nigar Award Special Award For 30 Years of Excellence in 1981

See also
 List of people from Lahore

References

External links
 
 Anwar Kamal Pasha's interview from the Archives of Lutfullah Khan on YouTube

1925 births
Film directors from Lahore
Urdu film producers
1987 deaths
Punjabi people
Pakistani film directors
Pakistani film producers
Forman Christian College alumni
University of the Punjab alumni
Nigar Award winners
Urdu-language film directors
People from Lahore